Speranza pustularia, the lesser maple spanworm, is a moth of the  family Geometridae. It is found from Nova Scotia to Florida, west to Mississippi, north to North Dakota and Saskatchewan.

The wingspan is 18–27 mm. Adults are on wing from May to July in the south and from June to August in the north. There is one generation per year.

The larvae feed on the leaves of maple (especially Acer rubrum) but have also been recorded on birch, cherry, poplar, Abies, Tsuga and tamarack.

External links
Bug Guide
Images
Moths of North Dakota

Macariini
Moths described in 1857